Michael, Mike or Mickey Keating may refer to:

Politics
 Michael Keating (Irish politician) (born 1946), Fine Gael then Progressive Democrats TD from Dublin
 Michael Keating (Manitoba politician)
 Michael Keating (political scientist) (born 1950)
 Michael Keating (public servant) (born 1940), senior Australian public servant
 Michael Keating (UN official) (born 1959), former Special Representative of the Secretary General, United Nations Assistance Mission in Somalia (UNSOM)

Sports
 Michael Keating (hurler) (born 1944), Irish hurling manager and former player
 Mickey Keating (athlete) (1931–2004), Canadian ice hockey player
 Mike Keating (ice hockey) (born 1957), Canadian ice hockey player

Others
 Michael Keating (actor) (born 1947), British actor
 Mickey Keating (director) (born 1990s), American film director
 Michael Keating (priest) (1793–1877), Irish Anglican priest